Esthlogena nigrosuturalis is a species of beetle in the family Cerambycidae. It was described by Galileo and Martins in 2011.

References

Pteropliini
Beetles described in 2011